Kamtschatarctos is an extinct genus of pinniped that lived approximately 15.97 to 11.608 mya during the Early Miocene in the Kavran-Ukhtolok Bay of Russia's Kamchatka Peninsula. It belonged to the family Odobenidae, the only extant species of which is the walrus.

Discovery 
Kamtschatarctos sinelnikovae is known from a partially complete skeleton, discovered in the Etolon Formation in Russia.

Taxonomy 
Kamtschatarctos is a relatively basal species of odobenid.

References 

Pinnipeds of Europe
Odobenids
Prehistoric pinnipeds
Prehistoric carnivoran genera